Lee Sang-gi (born 7 May 1996) is a South Korean football defender who plays for Gwangju FC.

References

External links 
 

1996 births
Living people
Association football defenders
South Korean footballers
Pohang Steelers players
Gimcheon Sangmu FC players
Daegu FC players
Gwangju FC players
K League 1 players
K League 2 players